Tsinjomitondraka is a town and commune in Madagascar. It belongs to the district of Boriziny, which is a part of Sofia Region. The population of the commune was estimated to be approximately 11,000 in 2001 commune census.

Tsinjomitondraka has a riverine harbour. Only primary schooling is available. The majority 60% of the population of the commune are farmers, while an additional 10% receives their livelihood from raising livestock. The most important crop is oranges, while other important products are coconuts, cassava and rice.  Additionally fishing employs 30% of the population.

References and notes 

Populated places in Sofia Region